The Regional Snowfall Index (RSI) is a system used by NOAA to assess the societal impacts of winter storms in the United States. The scale is a replacement for the Northeast Snowfall Impact Scale (NESIS) system, which was used for winter storms just in the Northeastern United States; Regional Snowfall Index assesses winter storm impacts in the six easternmost regions of the United States instead of just the Northeast. Since its initiation, the NCDC has assigned RSI values to nearly 600 winter storms since 1900.

Storms are ranked from Category 0 "Nuisance" to Category 5 "Extreme" on the scale. A Category 4 winter storm on the RSI scale is classified as "Crippling". The impact of the storms is assessed in six different regions of the United States: the Northeast, Northern Rockies and Plains, Ohio Valley, South, Southeast, and Upper Midwest. A Category 4 "Crippling" ranking is indicated by a numerical score between 10 and 18 on the scale.

Out of the nearly 600 historical winter storms assessed since 1900, only 74 storms have been given a Category 4 or above ranking, 48 of which were Category 4 storms. The highest ranking Category 4 winter storm is the March 2–8, 1915 United States blizzard, which had an RSI of 17.67. The most recent storm to receive a Category 4 ranking is the Tornado outbreak and blizzard of April 13–15, 2018, which scored an RSI value of 15.7. The following list orders the Category 4 storms chronologically.

List of Category 4 events
This list includes all winter storms which had a maximum RSI value in the Category 4 range. Storms that ranked as a Category 4 in some regions but ranked as a Category 5 in one or more other regions are not included in this list.

Listed by month

See also

List of Regional Snowfall Index Category 5 winter storms
List of Northeast Snowfall Impact Scale winter storms
List of blizzards

References

Climate of the United States
winter storms
Weather events in the United States